The Golden Globe Award for Best Screenplay – Motion Picture is a Golden Globe Award given by the Hollywood Foreign Press Association.

Winners and nominees

1940s

1950s

1960s

1970s

1980s

1990s

2000s

2010s

2020s

See also
 Academy Award for Best Story
 BAFTA Award for Best Original Screenplay
 BAFTA Award for Best Adapted Screenplay
 Academy Award for Best Original Screenplay
 Academy Award for Best Adapted Screenplay
 AACTA International Award for Best Screenplay
 Critics' Choice Movie Award for Best Screenplay
 Writers Guild of America Award for Best Original Screenplay
 Writers Guild of America Award for Best Adapted Screenplay

References

External links
 Nominees/Winners of Best Screenplay Award

Screenplay
 
Screenwriting awards for film